Milk skin or lactoderm refers to a sticky film of protein that forms on top of dairy milk and foods containing dairy milk (such as hot chocolate and some soups). Milk film can be produced both through conventional boiling and by microwaving the liquid, and as such can often be observed when heating milk for use in drinks such as drinking chocolate. It is caused by the denaturation of proteins such as beta-lactoglobulin (whey protein). The thickness of the skin varies dependent on a number of factors, including the temperature of the milk, the shape of the container, and the amount of milk in the container.

When milk is boiled, soluble milk proteins are denatured and then coagulate with milk's fat and form a sticky film across the top of the liquid, which then dries by evaporation. The layer does not need to be discarded and can be consumed, as protein's nutritional value is unaffected by the denaturation process. Milk film is often considered to be desirable and is used in several recipes for various foods. However, this is dependent on culture. For example, French Psychoanalyist Julia Kristeva's influential account of the abject uses the skin on milk as an important example of Horror.

In various cultures

Afghanistan 
Qaimaq Chai, or pink tea, is a traditional drink made with 2% or 3.25% milk skin.

Albania 
In Albanian milk skin is called "mazë". It is used in various traditional dishes, the most famous of which is Flija. Flija is found all around the regions traditionally inhabited by Albanians including Kosovo, regions of North Macedonia, Serbia and Montenegro.

Bangladesh 

Milk skin is typically known as "śōr" in Bangladesh. It is used to make tea and milk dishes rich in taste and consistency.

China 
Milk skin is called "nǎi pí”(奶皮) in Chinese. Considered to be of high nutritional value, Milk skin is often made into various desserts and delicacies. Milk skin is also favoured in regions such as  Inner Mongolia and Tibet, as milk products are of more importance in regular diet. Double skin milk (雙皮奶) is a Cantonese dessert developed in Shunde that has milk skin on the surface.

Cyprus
In Cyprus, milk skin in called tsippa and is used as a filling for a pastry called tsippopitta (literally "milk-skin pie").

France
In France, a type of rice pudding called teurgoule employs an extreme version of lactoderm where the milk-containing dish is left to cook for many hours.

India
In West Bengal the upper part of milk is called Sor(দুধের সর), a Bengali word. Sarpuria and Sarbhaja are the two sweets of Krishnanagar, West Bengal. It is also referred to as "kene" (ಕೆನೆ) in Kannada, Karnataka, "Aadai"(ஆடை) in Tamil, Tamil Nadu. There are various other regional references to milk skin too, like “saay” (साय) in Marathi, "malai"(मलाई) in Hindi, "paada"(പാൽപ്പാട) in Malayalam, "thari" in Ahirani, "meegada" in Telugu, "Baave" (pron: Baa-way) in Tulu (Coastal Karnataka), "chhali" in Bihar, Eastern UP & Jharkhand.In West Bengal, it is known as "Sor" and often spread on slices of bread as a substitute for butter. However, "malai" actually means cream. The milk skin is sometimes confused with the layer of cream which rises to the top of whole, untoned, unhomogenised milk as it cools.

Iran 
In Iran it is called sarshir literally meaning "top of the milk". It is used as a breakfast dish, usually mixed with honey or jam and spread on flat bread.

Japan
In Japan, a dairy product called "so" was made from layers of milk skin during the 7th-10th centuries. So was further processed to make "daigo". The dairy usage in Japan dwindled during the Heian era, and the technique was later adopted to produce yuba from soy milk.

Kenya
In Kenya, milk skin in called Maamalteet among the Kalenjin and is either used while cooking to thicken the sauces and stews or as a first step in making a wispy form of clarified butter and a fried milk protein (typically added to vegetable stir-fries).

Nepal
In Nepal this skin is referred to as tar  or chhali   and many people enjoy consuming the skin along with the milk. Some people prefer to use in making curd for it produces higher amount of "nauni"  (butter) while stirred with the help of "madani".

Pakistan
In Pakistan, milk skin is called "ملائی" ("malai.") However, "malai" actually means cream. The milk skin is sometimes confused with the layer of cream which rises to the top of whole, untoned, unhomogenised milk as it cools.

Russia
The milk skin is referred to as "penka" ("little foam") in Russian, and is infamous as the least favorite thing among children, but is used as an ingredient in some haute cuisine dishes like Guriev porridge. The skin that forms on baked milk is higher regarded and is preferred for those dishes.

Saudi Arabia
In Saudi Arabia, milk skin is called "جلالة”

Turkey
In Turkey, milk skin is called kaymak and is consumed traditionally at breakfasts or in Turkish desserts. Bal-kaymak (literally "honey-milk skin") on top of a slice of bread is also popular.

Spain, Portugal, Latin America
In many countries with Portuguese or Spanish ancestry, "milk skin" is translated as "nata", and lends itself to many baked goods and foodstuffs.

See also

 Double skin milk
 List of dairy products
 Tofu skin, a similar product made from soy milk

References

Milk